Anton Harber (October 27, 1958) is a South African journalist. He is executive director of the Campaign for Free Expression, director of the Henry Nxumalo Foundation an adjunct professor of journalism at the University of the Witwatersrand, and the co-editor or author of five books.

Early life
Anton Harber was born on October 27, 1958 in Durban, South Africa. He went to Carmel College, Durban, and graduated from the University of the Witwatersrand.

Career
Harber started his career at the Springs Advertiser and worked at the Sunday Post, the Sowetan and Rand Daily Mail newspapers. He was political reporter on the Rand Daily Mail when it was closed in 1985. He was a founding co-editor of the Weekly Mail, later known as the Mail & Guardian, 1985-1997. He was then chief executive officer of Kagiso Broadcasting (Pty) Ltd and executive director of Kagiso Media Ltd. He left to form internet company BIG Media (Pty) Ltd.

Harber was appointed to the Caxton Chair of Journalism at his alma mater, the University of the Witwatersrand, as an adjunct professor. In this capacity, he launched the African Investigative Journalism Conference (formerly the Power Reporting Conference) since 2007, and hosted the 10th Global Investigative Journalism Conference in Johannesburg in 2017. In March 2016, he became the editor-in-chief of eNCA for a period of 18 months.

In 2021, he founded the Campaign for Free Expression, a non-profit dedicated to defending and enabling free expression for all in southern Africa. Harber also runs the Henry Nxumalo Foundation NPC, which provides support to investigative journalists.

Harber was chair of the South African Conference of Editors in 1991, the chair of the National Association of Broadcasters in 1998, and the chair of the Freedom of Expression Institute in 2010. He serves on the board of directors of the Global Investigative Journalism Network  and the Centre for Collaborative Investigative Journalism (CCIJ).

He is the co-editor of three books about HIV/AIDS and investigative journalism in South Africa, and the author of Diepsloot (2011) and So, or the Record: Behind the headlines in an era of state capture (2020).

Harber was awarded the Missouri Medal of Honour in 1992 and the Pringle Award for Press Freedom in 1987.

Personal life
Harber is married to Harriet Gavshon, a television produce and they have two children. He is related to the late investigative journalist Arthur Gavshon.

Works

Harber, A (2017). Southern African Muckraking - 300 years of investigative journalism that shaped the region. Jacana. ISBN 978-1-4314-2782-6
Harber, A. (2020). So, for the Record: Behind the headlines in an era of state capture. Jonathan Ball. ISBN 978-1-77619-068-3

References

Living people
1958 births
Writers from Durban
University of the Witwatersrand alumni
South African columnists
South African investigative journalists
Academic staff of the University of the Witwatersrand